The Hungarian Academy of Sciences (MTA) is the most important and prestigious learned society of Hungary. Its seat is at the bank of the Danube in Budapest, between Széchenyi rakpart and Akadémia utca. Its main responsibilities are the cultivation of science, dissemination of scientific findings, supporting research and development, and representing Hungarian science domestically and around the world.

History
The history of the academy began in 1825 when Count István Széchenyi offered one year's income of his estate for the purposes of a Learned Society at a district session of the Diet in Pressburg (Pozsony, present Bratislava, seat of the Hungarian Parliament at the time), and his example was followed by other delegates. Its task was specified as the development of the Hungarian language and the study and propagation of the sciences and the arts in Hungarian. It  received its current name in 1845.

Its central building was inaugurated in 1865, in Renaissance Revival architecture style.  The architect was Friedrich August Stüler.

Sections

A scientific section is a unit of the Academy organized by one or some closely related branches of science. A scientific section follows with attention, promotes and evaluates all scientific activities conducted within its field(s) of science; takes a stand on scientific issues as well as in matters concerning science policy and research organization, submits opinion on the activities of the Academy's research institutes, and on those of university chairs and other research units that are supported by the Academy, and participates in the procedure of awarding the title of Doctor of the Hungarian Academy of Sciences, the post-Ph.D academic degree, the D.Sc degree in Hungary.

Today it has eleven main sections:
 I. Section of Linguistics and Literary Scholarship
 II. Section of Philosophy and Historical Sciences
 III. Section of Mathematics
 IV. Section of Agricultural Sciences
 V. Section of Medical Sciences
 VI. Section of Engineering Sciences
 VII. Section of Chemical Sciences
 VIII. Section of Biological Sciences
 IX. Section of Economics and Law
 X. Section of Earth Sciences
 XI. Section of Physical Sciences

Research institutes until 2019
 MTA Centre for Agricultural Research
 MTA Chemical Research Center 
 MTA Research Centre for Astronomy and Earth Sciences (involved with Konkoly Observatory)
 MTA Szeged Research Centre for Biology
 MTA Institute for Computer Science and Control
 MTA Centre for Ecological Research
 MTA Research Centre for Economic and Regional Studies
 MTA Centre for Energy Research 
 MTA Research Centre for the Humanities
 MTA Research Institute for Linguistics
 MTA Rényi Institute of Mathematics
 MTA Institute of Experimental Medicine
 MTA Research Centre for Natural Sciences
 MTA Institute of Nuclear Research
 MTA Wigner Research Centre for Physics
 MTA Centre for Social Sciences

Presidents of the Hungarian Academy of Sciences

Széchenyi Academy of Literature and Arts

The Széchenyi Academy of Literature and Arts was created in 1992 as an academy associated yet independent from the HAS. Some of the known members are György Konrád, Magda Szabó,  Péter Nádas writers, Zoltán Kocsis pianist, Miklós Jancsó, István Szabó film directors. The last president was Károly Makk, film director, who succeeded László Dobszay (resigned on April 20, 2011).

See also
 Open access in Hungary

References

External links
 
 Brief history of the Hungarian Academy of Sciences (in English)
 Hungarian Academy of Sciences (in English)—also available in Hungarian
 Picture of its central building -- additional picture
 homepage of the Széchenyi Academy
 The palace of the Hungarian Academy of Sciences

 
Hungaria
Hungaria
Academy of Sciences
Academy of Sciencesea
Academy of Sciences
Organizations established in 1825
Scientific organizations established in 1825
1825 establishments in the Austrian Empire
19th-century establishments in Hungary
Members of the International Council for Science
Members of the International Science Council